Gold Key Lake is a census-designated place located in Dingman Township, Pike County in the state of Pennsylvania.  The community is located north of Pennsylvania Route 739 in eastern Pike County surrounding its namesake, Gold Key Lake.  It is located between, and borders the CDP communities of, Sunrise Lake and Pocono Woodland Lakes.  As of the 2020 census the population was 1,979, with a median household income of $85.833.

Demographics

References

Census-designated places in Pike County, Pennsylvania
Census-designated places in Pennsylvania